David Saxe (born August 29, 1969) is a Las Vegas show producer and theater owner.  He produces dozens of large-scale stage productions around the world and in Las Vegas, several of which run nightly at his V Theater and Saxe Theater inside  Miracle Mile Shops at Planet Hollywood Resort and Casino.  A native of Las Vegas, David employs 300+ people and operates a 60,000 sq ft state-of-the-art production facility one mile from the Las Vegas Strip complete with dance studios, rehearsal stages, a sales & marketing operation, in-house graphics department, prop warehousing and office space.

Biography
Saxe's mother was a dancer in the Folies Bergère and his father was a saxophone player and bandleader for The Rat Pack.  Saxe grew up backstage.

At the age of 17, Saxe launched his sister's TV special Melinda Saxe - First Lady of Magic at Bourbon Street Hotel and Casino making him the youngest producer in Las Vegas' history. The show was a success and Melinda became a household name appearing on The Oprah Winfrey Show and The Tonight Show with Jay Leno.

Saxe opened his first theater in San Francisco and by the age of 30 had produced 25 shows.

In 2004, he opened V Theater in Las Vegas and developed V - The Ultimate Variety Show, which is still in production today.  Six years later, David acquired a second theater at Planet Hollywood Resort & Casino, the $34 million Saxe Theater. Saxe Theater opened with its first production, VEGAS! THE SHOW, and is now home to Beatleshow and Nathan Burton Comedy Magic as well.

Honors include UNLV - College of Hotel Administration's "Industry Executive of the Year" award for his work in the entertainment field and as an adjunct professor, In Business Las Vegas Magazine's "Top 40 Under 40"  as well as "Producer of the Year" by Vegas Seven Magazine.

David Saxe Productions
The following is a list of David Saxe's productions:

Current shows:
 
Saxe Theater-
 VEGAS! THE SHOW
 Beatleshow
 Nathan Burton Magic Show
V Theater-
 V - The Ultimate Variety Show
 Zombie Burlesque
 The Mentalist
 Popovich Comedy Pet Theater
 Marc Savard Comedy Hypnosis
 Hitzville The Show
 Las Vegas Live Comedy Club
 ALL SHOOK UP - Tribute to The King 
 Stripper 101 Pole Dancing Classes

Past shows:

 $1,000,000 Vegas Game Show
 Amazed!
 American Storm
 Aussie Heat
 Blonde Invasion
 Broadway Live!
 Bruce in the USA
 Buck Wild
 Clint Holmes
 Comedy Stop
 Country Superstars
 Daytripper
 Evil Dead The Musical 4D
 Gordie Brown
 La Femme Magique
 Matsuri
 Melinda the First Lady of Magic
 Ovation
 Point Break Live!
 Prodigy
 Scarlett - Princess of Magic
 Showgirls of Magic
 Sin City Comedy Show
 Superstars On Stage
 The Magic and Tigers of Rick Thomas
 The Scintas
 Toxic Audio
 Trent Carlini
 Vegas Gone Country
 X Girls
And many more

References

External links
 Official Website of David Saxe & David Saxe Productions 
 David Saxe Interview on Talktails (Vegas Video Network)
 VEGAS! THE SHOW - Written and produced by David Saxe Productions
 

1969 births
Living people
American theatre managers and producers
University of Nevada, Las Vegas alumni